Živan Pešić (born 7 July 1993) is a Serbian handball player for RK Vojvodina and the Serbia national team.

Career
After starting out at Sintelon, Pešić moved abroad to Hungary and signed with MKB Veszprém in 2010. He was loaned to ETO-SZESE Győr in early 2014. Later on, Pešić played for Slovenian club Celje until late 2015. He returned to his homeland and signed with Partizan in March 2016.

A Serbia international since 2013, Pešić participated at the 2020 European Men's Handball Championship.

Honours
Vojvodina
 Serbian Handball Super League: 2016–17

References

External links
 EHF record
 MKSZ record

1993 births
Living people
Sportspeople from Novi Sad
Serbian male handball players
Veszprém KC players
RK Partizan players
RK Vojvodina players
CB Ademar León players
Liga ASOBAL players
Expatriate handball players
Serbian expatriate sportspeople in Hungary
Serbian expatriate sportspeople in Slovenia
Serbian expatriate sportspeople in Spain
Serbian expatriate sportspeople in Croatia